Lieutenant William Edrington Gray,  (born 11 October 1898, date of death unknown) was a Scottish World War I flying ace credited with seven aerial victories.

Biography
Gray was the son of Edward and Annabella Gray of Edrington Castle in Mordington, Berwickshire, Scotland. He joined the Royal Naval Air Service on 25 July 1917. By May 1918, when Gray went operational, the RNAS had been incorporated into the Royal Air Force. Gray was assigned to a former naval squadron, No. 213, as a Sopwith Camel pilot.

On 19 May 1918, Gray was patrolling with William Pinder. Vizefeldwebel Triebswetter of Jasta 16 pulled away from burning a Belgian observation balloon when the British pair shot him down. This began a run of victories for Gray that ran almost to war's end. Gray won a Distinguished Flying Cross on 2 November 1918. He also received two belated awards in early 1919, being Mentioned in Despatches and winning the Croix de Guerre.

After the war Gray left the RAF, being transferred to the unemployed list on 22 June 1919, and pursued a career as aeronautical engineer. This was a long-standing interest, as he and his older brother Edward Leadbetter Gray (1897–1918) had built a primitive monoplane in 1910–1911, and a biplane in 1914–1915. On 25 October 1926 he filed a patent for his aircraft undercarriage design at the UK Patent Office, and did the same at the U.S. Office on 14 October 1927, being granted U.S. Patent No. 1,716,439 on 11 June 1929. In 1962 Gray, then Principal Scientific Officer at the Royal Aircraft Establishment was made an Officer of the Order of the British Empire in recognition of his services.

List of aerial victories

Honours and awards
Distinguished Flying Cross
Lieutenant William Edrington Gray (Sea Patrol).
Since May last this officer has destroyed three enemy machines and has taken part in five low-bombing raids. He is a most efficient officer, possessing great presence of mind, and invariably displaying cool courage in difficult situations. On a recent occasion he led a formation of forty machines to bomb an aerodrome; this was most successfully accomplished, and was largely due to Lieut. Gray's able and skilful leadership.

Mention in Despatches
For "distinguished service in war areas". Gazetted on 1 January 1919.

Croix de Guerre with Palme
Gazetted 7 February 1919.

References
Notes

Bibliography
 

1898 births
Year of death missing
People from Berwickshire
Royal Naval Air Service aviators
Royal Flying Corps officers
British World War I flying aces
Scottish flying aces
Recipients of the Distinguished Flying Cross (United Kingdom)
Recipients of the Croix de Guerre 1914–1918 (France)
Officers of the Order of the British Empire